Lieutenant Alfred Michael Koch MC  was a Swiss-born Canadian flying ace credited with ten aerial victories.

Early life 
Alfred Michael Koch was born on 25 February 1894 in Arosa, Graubünden, Switzerland. He moved to Canada at the age of four years. His father was John Koch. The younger Koch enlisted in the 19th Alberta Dragoons on 23 September 1914 at Valcartier, Canada, and was assigned regimental number 2077. He listed a home address in Edmonton, Alberta, Canada, his profession as law student, and claimed prior military experience. His physical examination reported him as 5 feet 3 1/2 inches tall. He reportedly was dark-complected, with dark brown hair, grey eyes, and moles on his right arm.

World War I 
Koch was originally a trumpeter for the Alberta Dragoons. He transferred to the 1st Cavalry Division CEF and shipped out for the war zone.

He flew as an aerial observer in 6 Squadron, and was wounded in action on 22 October 1916. He made the transition to fighter pilot and was posted to fly 70 Squadron's Sopwith Camels. On 18 October 1917, he began a decade of successes that carried him through to 23 March 1918; he succeeded against nine German fighter planes as well as destroying one of their observation balloons. However, he was not awarded the Military Cross for these victories. When his Military Cross citation was gazetted on 22 June 1918, it read:

The last known information about Koch is that he was wounded once again in 1918.

List of aerial victories
All victories scored while flying a Sopwith Camel fighter plane for No. 70 Squadron RAF.

References

1894 births
Recipients of the Military Cross
Swiss emigrants to Canada
Canadian people of Swiss-German descent
Canadian World War I flying aces
1984 deaths
Canadian recipients of the Military Cross